Khalifehlu (also Romanized as Khalīfehlū; also known as Khalaf ‘Alī and Khal’falu) is a village in Alvand Rural District, in the Central District of Khorramdarreh County, Zanjan Province, Iran. At the 2006 census, its population was 80, in 22 families. Located about 7 km north of Khorramdarreh, in the central part of the Tarom magmatic zone, Khalifehlu is the site of significant epithermal ore deposits including copper and gold. hydrothermal alteration, extensive breccia formation, and silicic veins are among the significant characteristics of the Khalifehlu deposit. The ores found at Khalifehlu include pyrite, chalcopyrite, bornite, covolite, chalcocite, hematite, and native gold.

References 

Populated places in Khorramdarreh County